is an Echizen Railway Mikuni Awara Line railway station located in the city of Fukui, Fukui Prefecture, Japan.

Lines

Station layout
The station consists of one side platform serving a single bi-directional track. The station is unattended.

Adjacent stations

History
Matsumoto Machiya Station was opened on September 27, 2015.

Surrounding area
The area is primarily residential.

See also
 List of railway stations in Japan

External links

  

Railway stations in Fukui Prefecture
Railway stations in Japan opened in 2015
Mikuni Awara Line
Fukui (city)